Pipa Subdistrict is a subdistrict in Gulou District, Xuzhou, Jiangsu province, China. , it has 11 residential neighborhoods under its administration:
Pipa Community
Wanzhai Community
Taizi Community
Liwo Community
Bali Community
Yinzhuang Community
Binhe Community
Qingshuiwan Community
Pipahuayuan Community
Yiju Community
Zehuijiayuan Community

See also 
 List of township-level divisions of Jiangsu

References 

Township-level divisions of Jiangsu
Administrative divisions of Xuzhou